John Dellamarta (born 26 August 1954) is a former Australian rules footballer who played with Collingwood and Melbourne in the Victorian Football League (VFL).

Notes

External links 		
		
		
		
		
		
		
1954 births
Living people
Australian rules footballers from Victoria (Australia)		
Collingwood Football Club players		
Melbourne Football Club players